The Bernard de Marigny had several famous members :

 Augustin Etienne Gaspard Bernard de Marigny ( — 1782), Navy officer during the War of American Independence
 Charles-René de Bernard de Marigny (1740-1816), Navy officer during the War of American Independence, the French Revolutionary Wars and the Napoleonic Wars
 Gaspard de Bernard de Marigny (1754-1794), general in the counter-Revolutionary Vendean insurrection.
French noble families

See also 
 Bernard de Marigny